Éric Thériault (born 1967 in Trois-Rivières, Quebec) is a Canadian comics artist, writer, illustrator and blogger living in Montreal, Quebec, Canada.

Biography 

Éric Thériault began as a teenager publishing comics in a fanzine called Météor in 1982, created with the help of Stéphane Sicard. This fanzine specialized in science fiction and superheroes.

Among his works include his self-published comic book Veena, published intermittently since 1991, initially as a minicomic, then later as an alternative comic book, and in recent years as a webcomic. He also created John Star, published in the Veena comic book and in Mensuhell. He published various short stories in many anthologies like Real Stuff, Duplex Planet (both at Fantagraphics Books), Legal Action Comics, and 9-11: Emergency Relief (Alternative Comics).

He also worked in mainstream and alternative comics on titles such as Captain Canuck, Terra Obscura, Tales of the Teenage Mutant Ninja Turtles and on a Johnny Dollar adaptation for Moonstone Books in 2003.

Bibliography

Albums 

 L'Univers Rockefeller, 1989, éditions du Phylactère, Montreal.
 Veena et les Spectres du Temps, 2010, Éditions 400 Coups Rotor label, Montreal.
 Veena: detective dello strano ed insolito, 2011, E.F.edizioni, Italy.

Group albums 

 Écran D'arrêt, 1991, A.C.I.B.D., Montreal ;
 Rêves, 1992, Éditions du Phylactère/Paje éditeur/A.C.I.B.D., Montreal ;
 Coeurs de Glace, 2009, Éditions 400 Coups Rotor label, Montreal.
 Frankenstein Réassemblé, 2010, Éditions 400 Coups Rotor label, Montreal.

Periodical publications 

Magazines
 Zeppelin, Quebec city comics magazine, 1992–1993 ;
 Solaris, Quebec's science fiction and fantasy magazine, 1993 ;
 Zine Zag, 100% comics, 1998–2004 ;
 Safarir, Quebec's illustrated humour magazine, 2003–2010.

Fanzines
 Météor, science fiction comics, 1982 ;
 Laser, science fiction comics, 1982–1984  ;
 Bédézine, BD de science-fiction, 1983 ;
 Empire, science fiction comics, 1984 ;
 Krypton, science fiction comics, 1985–1988 ;
 Rectangle, experimental comics, 1987–1989 ;
 XL5, science fiction comics, 1989–1990 ;
 Veena and the Time Machine, science fiction comics, 1991–1993 ;
 MensuHell, Montreal underground comics, 2000–2009.

Exhibitions

Group exhibitions 

 1985 : Festival de la caricature et de la bande dessinée, CEGEP de Trois-Rivières, Trois-Rivières ;
 1991 : Écran D'arrêt, CEGEP du Vieux-Montreal, 6th Festival international de bande dessinée de Montréal, Montreal ;
 1992 : Rêves, CEGEP du Vieux-Montréal, 7th Festival international de bande dessinée de Montréal, Montreal ;
 1992 : Cadres, BD actuelle au Québec, Les Foufounes Électriques, 7th Festival international de bande dessinée de Montréal, Montreal ;
 1993 : Dessinateurs du Québec, Centre belge de la bande dessinée, Bruxelles (Belgique).

Awards 

 1993 : Prix Solaris comics section, second prize for the comic short story Balmoral published in the magazine Solaris (issue number 106, August 1993).

Bibliography and sources 
 Le Phylactère maudit, interview by Michel Pleau, in Zine Zag, issue number 2, May 1999, éditions Publika, Saint-Martin 
Bernard Dubois, Bande dessinée québécoise : répertoire bibliographique à suivre, éditions D.B.K., 1996 
Michel Viau, BDQ, Répertoire des publications de bandes dessinées au Québec des origines à nos jours, éditions Mille-Îles, 1999 
Mira Falardeau, Histoire de la bande dessinée au Québec, VLB éditeur, 2008

See also 
 Bande dessinée
 Canadian comics
 Quebec comic strips

External links 
 Biography on Lambiek Comiclopedia
 Biography and bibliography on Comic Book Database
 Official Éric Thériault website
 Veena webcomic
 Linkedin page

Living people
1967 births
Artists from Quebec
People from Trois-Rivières
Canadian comics writers
Canadian comics artists
Writers from Quebec